This is a list of the French singles & airplay chart reviews number-ones of 1959.

Number-ones by week

Singles chart

See also
1959 in music
List of number-one hits (France)

References

1959 in France
1959 record charts
Lists of number-one songs in France